Adolph Woermann (10 December 1847 in Hamburg – 4 May 1911 in the Grönwohld-Hof near Trittau) was a German merchant, shipowner and politician, who was also instrumental in the establishment of German colonies in Africa. In his time he was the largest German trader to West Africa and – with his Woermann-Linie – the largest private shipowner in the world. Recent scholarship has accused him of basing his fortunes on exploitation and war profiteering,

References

External links
 

1847 births
1911 deaths
Businesspeople from Hamburg
German Lutherans
National Liberal Party (Germany) politicians
Members of the 6th Reichstag of the German Empire
Members of the 7th Reichstag of the German Empire
19th-century German businesspeople
Businesspeople in shipping
German colonisation in Africa
19th-century Lutherans